Sociedad Deportiva Torina is a Spanish football team located in Bárcena de Pie de Concha, in the autonomous community of Cantabria. Founded in 1960 it currently plays in Tercera División RFEF – Group 3, holding home matches at Estadio Municipal Bárcena de Pie de Concha with a capacity of 2,000 spectators.

History
SD Torina was founded in 1960.

Season to season

5 seasons in Tercera División
1 season in Tercera División RFEF

References

Football clubs in Cantabria
Association football clubs established in 1960
1960 establishments in Spain